The Jachen is a river in Bavaria, Germany. It flows into Isar south of Lenggries.

See also
List of rivers of Bavaria

References

Rivers of Bavaria
Rivers of Germany